Dead Kansas is a 2013 five-part webseries, written, directed, and produced by Aaron K. Carter.

Plot
In a post-apocalyptic land consumed by Rottens, a simple farmer and his teenage daughter struggle to survive. Meanwhile, an unruly gang make a plan to kidnap and sell the daughter for their own selfish profit. With the farmer/gang confrontation, a wicked tornado approaching, and "Rottens" everywhere - who will get out alive?

Cast
 Irwin Keyes – Giant 
 Ben Woolf – Squeak
 Joe McQueen – Skinny 
 Alexandria Lightford - Emma
 Erin Miracle – Emma 
 Aaron Guerrero – Glenn
 Michael Camp - Jebediah 
 Kevin Beardsley - Zeke / Rusty
 Tony Della Catena  – Leo 
 Darryl Dick – Doctor Emerson 
 Juliette Danielle – Rebecca

Filming locations
Dead Kansas was filmed in Los Angeles, California, primarily around the San Fernando Valley. A portion was filmed at a circus-themed bar called, California Institute of Abnormalarts. It is located at 11334 Burbank Blvd, in North Hollywood, California 91601. Every room is decorated with an eclectic assortment of ugly dolls, strange wall hangings, clowns, skeletons, and other spooky Halloween themed relics. CIA almost has a museum-like feel. Production was permitted only 4 hours to film there.

Rottens
Zombies are referred to as "Rottens" in Dead Kansas. There is only one physical zombie, in full make-up, towards the end of the film. The other Rottens are never shown. They are only simulated via Point Of View (POV) in black & white. The camera acted as the Rotten's eyes in certain shots, while the actors reacted. As tempting as it was to use traditional make-up and show the Rottens, the director specifically chose POV to do something different. Dead Kansas is the first zombie film to extensively use POV.

Release
The pilot of the webseries premiered on September 24, 2012 on YouTube. All five acts were eventually tied together and released on DVD as a full-length film in October 2013.  The film version of the series, screened at the 2014 FANtastic Horror Film Festival - where it won an award for Best Zombie Film.  Dead Kansas was released on Amazon Video, February 26, 2015.

Soundtrack
The punk-rock music heard throughout the film is from the band Power Of Aggression. They are from the Hollywood area and were active during 1999 through the early 2000s. The band was originally called Gauntlet in the early-90s with former members Daniel Gallagher & Eddy Darbinian on guitars with Matthew Muller on bass guitar.  The band eventually reformed in 1999, changed their name to Power of Aggression and adopted most of the songs from Gauntlet. Original member and chief-songwriter Anthony Robinson played lead guitar & vocals, Adam Ledezma played drums and Aaron K. Carter played bass guitar. When a soundtrack was needed, producers Aaron K. Carter and Adam Ledezma used the Power Of Aggression demo-tape that they recorded over a decade ago. The songs featured in Dead Kansas include: "The Ruler", "Walls Of Insanity", "Hate", "The Way We Feel", "Behold the Terror", and "Now".  Composer Jonathan Price provided the rest of the music score.

External links
Official site
 
Amazon Video

References

2012 web series debuts
2010s English-language films
American zombie films
American drama web series
2013 web series endings
Zombie web series